Casitas Springs (Casitas, Spanish for "little houses") is an unincorporated community in Ventura County, California, located  east of Lake Casitas. It is an old community which was recorded as Arroyo de Las Casitas (“creek of the little houses”) in 1864. It has a population of 1,038 as of 1999, down from 1,090 in 1990 Census.

It is known for its groves of eucalyptus trees along the highway.

History
The community was first recorded in 1864 under the name Arroyo de Las Casitas (“creek of the little houses”).

The same  2005 winter storms that damaged nearby La Conchita, California also damaged Casitas Springs.

Economy
The oldest, most rural winery in Ventura County is near the community.

Notable people
 Johnny Cash, musician

See also
Roadshow Revival

References

 
Unincorporated communities in Ventura County, California
Unincorporated communities in California